A Giant's Church is the name given to prehistoric stone enclosures found in the Ostrobothnia region of Finland. Dating from the subneolithic period (3500–2000 BC), they are thought to be a rare example of monumental architecture built by hunter-gatherers in Northern Europe.

Description
The stone enclosures are rectangular or oval boulder embankments. Around forty sites are known, located in a  strip on the northwest coast of Finland (Ostrobothnia). Although located inland today, they were probably originally on the seashore. There is no hard evidence as to their intended use. It is possible they were used by hunters of seals on the Spring ice, who were away from their usual dwelling places. 

The Giants' Churches have been dated to the "subneolithic" (ie. Mesolithic people who are beginning to use Neolithic artefacts) around 3500–2000 BC. By 1500 BC they were abandoned.

References

External links
 

4th-millennium BC establishments
16th-century BC disestablishments
Mesolithic Europe
Neolithic Finland
Archaeology of Finland
Ostrobothnia (region)